"On with the Dance" is the first episode of the fifth and final series of the period drama Upstairs, Downstairs. It first aired on 7 September 1975 on ITV.

Background
"On with the Dance" was recorded in the studio on 9 and 10 January 1975, with a retake filmed on the morning of 7 April. It is the first episode to feature Anne Yarker and Jonathan Seeley as Virginia's children, Alice and William, and Karen Dotrice as Lily Hawkins. The events between the end of series 4 and this episode are covered in a bridge story.

Cast
Jean Marsh - Rose 
Angela Baddeley - Mrs Bridges
Gordon Jackson - Hudson 
Lesley-Anne Down - Georgina Worsley
Simon Williams - James Bellamy
David Langton - Richard Bellamy
Hannah Gordon - Virginia Bellamy
Christopher Beeny - Edward
Karen Dotrice - Lily
Jenny Tomasin - Ruby 
Jacqueline Tong - Daisy
Gareth Hunt - Frederick
Anne Yarker - Alice Hamilton
Jonathan Seely - William Hamilton

Plot
"On with the Dance" opens on 19 July 1919 and the Victory Parade is passing near Eaton Place. Georgina is taking part, and Rose and Lily go on the street to watch while Hudson and Mrs Bridges use Hudson's deerstalking telescope to view the March from an upstairs window. Edward and Daisy have left service and been replaced by Frederick Norton, James's former batman, and Lily Hawkins. Edward, now a door-to-door salesman, and Daisy, who is pregnant, visit Eaton Place. However, there is a tense atmosphere when the couple see how easily they have been replaced and they don't stay long.

Richard and Virginia return from their honeymoon in Paris, having also been to Versailles for the signing of the Treaty and they start looking for a new house. With only Georgina and James living at Eaton Place, there is not enough work for the servants to do. After Virginia refuses to agree to moving to 165, James gives the servants four weeks notice and says he will sell the house. However, a week or so later James and Georgina entertain Virginia's children, William and Alice, for the afternoon while she and Richard go shopping. When they return to collect the children, William and Alice say what a wonderful time they have had. James and Georgina then persuade Virginia into agreeing to move to Eaton Place.

References
Richard Marson, "Inside UpDown - The Story of Upstairs, Downstairs", Kaleidoscope Publishing, 2005
Updown.org.uk - Upstairs, Downstairs Fansite

Upstairs, Downstairs (series 5) episodes
1975 British television episodes
Fiction set in 1919